Sven Relander (24 May 1897 – 13 August 1956) was a Finnish stage and film actor.

Selected filmography
 The Village Shoemakers (1923)
 False Greta (1934)
 North Express (1947)
 The Girl from Moon Bridge (1953)

References

Bibliography
 Olsoni, Eric: Från Strindberg till Anouilh: Hundra teateraftnar i Helsingfors. Söderström, 1964.

External links
 

1897 births
1956 deaths
Male actors from Helsinki
Finnish male film actors
Finnish male silent film actors
20th-century Finnish male actors
People from Uusimaa Province (Grand Duchy of Finland)